GamesMaster Catalog was a wargaming magazine published in 1980 by Boynton & Assoc, Clifton House, Clifton, VA.

Contents
GamesMaster Catalog was the first comprehensive guide for published games.

Reception
Steve Jackson reviewed GamesMaster Catalog in The Space Gamer No. 37. Jackson commented that "the GamesMaster Catalog is a good buy for the serious game collector - and a must for a game club or store."

References

Wargaming magazines